Attambelos VI of Characene was a ruler of the state of Characene,
 who ruled from approximately 101/02-105/06 and is known only from the coins he minted.

References

Year of birth missing
Year of death missing
2nd-century deaths
2nd-century monarchs in the Middle East
Kings of Characene